Hwangjangsan is a mountain of Gyeongsangbuk-do, eastern South Korea. It has an elevation of 1,077 metres.

See also
List of mountains of Korea

References

Mountains of South Korea
Mountains of North Gyeongsang Province
One-thousanders of South Korea